Berni may refer to:


People

Given name
 Berni Álvarez (born 1971), Spanish basketball player
 Berni Collas (1954–2010), Belgian politician
 Berni Flint (born 1952), British singer and songwriter
 Berni Goldblat, Swiss-Zimbabwean filmmaker and critic
 Berni Huber (born 1967), German Olympic alpine skier
 Berni Searle (born 1964), South African artist who works with photography, video, and film
 Berni Tamames (born 1973), Spanish basketball player

Surname
 Berni (surname)

Other
 Berni Inn, a chain of British steakhouses
 Jacob Berni House, Alma, Wisconsin
 Poggio Berni, a frazione (kind of subdivision of municipality) of Italy

See also
 Bern (disambiguation)
 Berne (disambiguation)
 Bernie (disambiguation)
 Berny (disambiguation)
 Bernhard, a given name